Magenta is a 1996 film by Gregory C. Haynes.

Plot
Michael Walsh, a husband and father, falls for a girl named Magenta. The difficulty is that Magenta is his wife's underaged sister. Magenta is persistent in pursuing Michael, though, and this provides the drama in the story.

Cast
 Julian McMahon as Michael Walsh
 Alison Storry as Helen Walsh
 Marklen Kennedy as Craig
 Crystal Dillan Atkins as Magenta
 Fields Company as Dr. Fields
 Gedeon Burkhard as Roy

External links

1996 films
1996 drama films
Films scored by Harald Kloser
1990s English-language films